The  (en: Left Youth ['solid]) is a political youth organisation in Germany. It is the official youth wing of the political party The Left.

History 

Solid: the socialist youth was formed in Hanover in June 1999 and was accepted by the Party of Democratic Socialism as a youth organisation "close to PDS" in March 2002. Membership is for people between the ages of 14 and 35 and in March 2005 they had 1,500 members.

But due to differences, other young members formed the "PDS Youth", a youth organisation integrated within the party and by self-definition of the group serving to form future cadres for the full-fledged party. The PDS-youth was small compared to ['solid] and only represented in a small number of the federal States of Germany.

On Solid's federal delegate congress on 20 May 2007, the organisation reorganised to the present structure including the former PDS Youth and the youth organisation of WASG. This was a response to the fusion of the Left Party/PDS and WASG.

References

External links 
 Website

The Left (Germany)
2007 establishments in Germany
Anti-capitalist organizations
Anti-fascist organizations
Democratic socialism
Youth wings of Party of the European Left member parties
Youth wings of political parties in Germany